Ritesh Perambra (born 1991) is an Indian footballer, who played for Mumbai F.C. between 2012 and 2014.

Career
Perambra was born on 3 January 1991 in Maharashtra. He played for the Mumbai F.C. youth team, before making his debut for the first team on 20 April 2013 against ONGC F.C. in which he started and played 78 minutes as Mumbai drew the match 1–1.

Career statistics

References

External links 
 Mumbai Football Club Profile.

1991 births
Living people
People from Maharashtra
Footballers from Maharashtra
I-League players
Association football defenders
Indian footballers
Mumbai FC players